Die Verkündigung (German "The Annunciation") may refer to:

Verkündigung (Braunfels), opera by Walter Braunfels, premiered 1948
"Verkündigung", art song by Paul Dessau